Wieliczki  is a village in Olecko County, Warmian-Masurian Voivodeship, in northern Poland. It is the seat of the gmina (administrative district) called Gmina Wieliczki. 

The village has a population of 730.

References

Wieliczki